Granville County is a county located on the northern border of the U.S. state of North Carolina. As of the 2020 census, the population was 60,992. Its county seat is Oxford.

Granville County encompasses Oxford, NC Micropolitan Statistical Area, which is also included in the Raleigh-Durham-Chapel Hill, NC Combined Statistical Area.

The county has access to Kerr Lake and Falls Lake and is part of the Roanoke, Tar and Neuse River watersheds.

History
The county was formed by English colonists in 1746 from Edgecombe County.  It was named for John Carteret, 2nd Earl Granville, who as heir to one of the eight original Lords Proprietors of the Province of Carolina, claimed one eighth of the land granted in the charter of 1665. The claim was established as consisting of approximately the northern half of North Carolina, and this territory came to be known as the Granville District, also known as Oxford.

In 1752, parts of Granville, Bladen, and Johnston counties were combined to form Orange County. In 1764, the eastern part of Granville County was reassigned to the new Bute County.  Finally, in 1881, parts of Granville, Franklin, and Warren counties were taken to be combined as Vance County.

John Penn (1741-1788) was born in Caroline County, Virginia, and was a planter and politician of early America. After passing the bar, Penn moved to Granville County in 1774.  The county had become the hub of Carolina's independence campaign. A remarkable orator, Penn had earned a place at the Third Provincial Congress of 1775, and he replaced Richard Caswell, joining William Hooper and Joseph Hewes in Philadelphia for the convening of the Continental Congress in 1776. Later, John Penn, with Cornelius Harnett and John Williams, signed the Articles of Confederation for North Carolina. Penn retired to Granville County, and he died at a relatively young age of 48 years in 1788. His remains are interred at the Guilford Courthouse National Military Park in Greensboro, NC.

Like most early counties on the eastern side of the early North Carolina colony, Granville was site of the Tuscarora uprising. Once the natives were defeated in the Tuscarora War, Virginia farmers and their families settled Granville County, where they concentrated on tobacco as a commodity crop. The economy of the region was dependent on slave labor, as tobacco was very labor-intensive to cultivate and process. By the start of the Civil War, Granville planters worked more than 10,000 slaves on their farms, at a time when total county population was 23,396.

Civil War to present
During the Civil War, more than 2,000 men from Granville County served the Confederacy. One company was known as the "Granville Grays."  Most of these men fought in the major battles of the war. Surprisingly, many survived until the end of the war.

Although the Civil War brought an end to the plantation and slave labor economy that had made Granville County prosperous, the agricultural sector continued to thrive in the county. Freedmen stayed in Oxford to work, and the discovery of bright leaf tobacco stimulated the industry. Many African Americans in Granville County were already free before the start of the Civil War; some had migrated into North Carolina as free people from Virginia in the colonial era. The free people of color before the Civil War were often descendants of families formed by unions between white women (who were free) and African or African-American men before the American Revolution. They made lasting contributions to the region, particularly through their skilled labor. Several black masons constructed homes for the county's wealthy landowners. Additionally, the bright leaf tobacco crop proved a successful agricultural product for Granville County. The sandy soil and a new tobacco crop that could be "flue-dried" proved a great incentive to farmers and tobacco manufacturers.

According to historian William S. Powell, Granville has remained a top tobacco-producing county in North Carolina for several decades. By the late 1800s and early 1900s, Oxford had become a thriving town with new industries, schools, literary institutions, and orphanages, due to jobs created by the bright tobacco crop.

In the late 1800s and early 1900s, northern Granville County, together with Halifax County, Virginia, were important mining areas.  Copper, tungsten, silver and gold were mined in the region.  The Richmond to Danville Railroad was a critical lifeline to the northern part of the county and provided an important link for miners and farmers to get their goods to larger markets in Richmond and Washington, D.C.

From the late 19th century into the early 20th century, whites in Granville County lynched six African Americans, a number of extralegal murders equalled by two other counties in the state. Most of these killings took place in the decades around the turn of the century. Each of the three counties is tied in having the second-highest number of lynchings per county. Among these was a double lynching in the county seat on December 1, 1881. An armed mob of masked men stormed into the county jail, forcing the jailer to give them the keys. They took out John Brodie and Shadrack Hester, two African-American men charged with murdering a local white man. They took the prisoners to a tree near where the death took place, and hanged them.

During the late 1800s and early 1900s, Granville County played a pivotal role as tobacco supplier for the southeast United States. With many farms and contracts tied to major tobacco companies, such as American Tobacco Company, Lorillard, Brown & Williamson, and Liggett Group, the local farmers became prosperous. During the Great Depression, the tobacco fields were subject to a new plant disease. The Granville Wilt Disease, as it became known, destroyed tobacco crops all across northern North Carolina. Botanists and horticulturists found a cure for the disease at the Tobacco Research Center located in Oxford.

Camp Butner, opened in 1942 as a training camp for World War II soldiers, once encompassed more than 40,000 acres in Granville, Person, and Durham counties. During the war, more than 30,000 soldiers were trained at Camp Butner, including the 35th and 89th divisions. The hilly topography at Camp Butner proved helpful in teaching soldiers how to respond to gas bombings and how to use camouflage and cross rivers. Additionally, both German and Italian prisoners served as cooks and janitors at Camp Butner. Today, most of the land that was Camp Butner now belongs to the North Carolina government. Umstead Hospital, which is no longer operational, was located at the Camp Butner site.

In the 1950s and 1960s, various manufacturing businesses built up across Granville County, and the region gradually became more industrialized. Today, the manufacturing industry produces cosmetics, tires, and clothing products in Granville County.

Granville County Courthouse

The Granville County Courthouse, of Greek Revival architecture, was built in 1840 and added to the National Register of Historic Places in 1979.

Geography

State and local protected areas 
 Ledge Creek Forest Conservation Area
 Roberts Chapel Conservation Area

Major water bodies 
 Beaver Dam Lake
 Beaverdam Creek
 Coon Creek
 Falls Lake
 Fishing Creek
 Island Creek Reservoir
 John H. Kerr Reservoir
 Lake Butner
 Lake Devin
 Roanoke River
 Smith Creek
 Tar River

Adjacent counties
 Halifax County, Virginia - north
 Mecklenburg County, Virginia - north
 Vance County - east
 Franklin County - east
 Wake County- south
 Durham County - southwest
 Person County - northwest

Major highways

Major infrastructure 
 Henderson Oxford Airport

Demographics

2020 census

As of the 2020 United States census, there were 60,992 people, 21,400 households, and 15,182 families residing in the county.

2017
As of the census of 2017, there were 59,557 people in 20,628 households residing in the county.  The population density was 111.6 people per square mile (43.1/km2).  There were 22,827 housing units at an average density of 42.5 per square mile (16.4/km2).  The racial makeup of the county was 58% White, 30% Black, 8% Hispanic, 2% Two or more Races, 1% Asian, 1% American Indian.

There were 20,628 households, out of which 31.0% had children under the age of 18 living with them.  The average household size was 2.90.  In the county, the population was spread out, with 22.3% under the age of 18, 8.5% from 18 to 24, 12.0% from 25 to 34, 24.1% from 35 to 49, 20.7% from 50 to 64, and 12.40% who were 65 years of age or older. For every 100 females there were 114.7 males.

The median income for a household in the county was $48,196, and the mean household income was $55,849.  The median and mean income for a family was $56,493 and $64,311, respectively. The per capita income for the county was $21,201.  About 7.6% of families and 11.9% of the population were below the poverty line, including 14.4% of those under age 18 and 11.1% of those age 65 or over.

Law and government
Granville County is a member of the Kerr-Tar Regional Council of Governments.  Granville County is governed by a commissioner/manager form of government under the laws of the state of North Carolina. Granville County has seven commissioner electoral districts.

The Granville County Commissioners are Edgar Smoak (Chair), Zelodis Jay (Vice-Chair), David Smith, Tony W. Cozart, Sue Hinman, Timothy Karan, and Russ May

Politics
Granville County was long a Democratic stronghold, for the most part, if not exclusively, only supporting Democratic candidates in presidential election until 1968, when it supported George Wallace. Today, it is somewhat of a national bellwether, having from 1992 onward supported the national winner in all the presidential elections with the exception of 2000, when it supported Al Gore, and 2020, when it supported Donald Trump.

Education
The Granville County School System contains 9 elementary schools, 4 middle schools, 5 high schools

High Schools
 J.F. Webb High School (Oxford)
 J.F. Webb School of Health and Life Sciences
 Granville Central High School (Stem)
 Granville Early College High (affiliated with Vance-Granville Community College, which has a campus in Butner) (Creedmoor)
 South Granville High School (Creedmoor)

Middle Schools
 Butner-Stem Middle (Butner) (Traditional and Year Round)
 G.C. Hawley Middle (Creedmoor)
 Mary Potter Middle (Oxford)
 Northern Granville Middle (Oxford) (Traditional and Year Round)

Elementary Schools
 Butner-Stem Elementary (Butner) (Traditional and Year Round)
 C.G. Credle Elementary (Oxford)
 Creedmoor Elementary (Creedmoor)
 Mt. Energy Elementary (Creedmoor)
 Stovall-Shaw Elementary (Stovall)
 Tar River Elementary (Franklinton)
 West Oxford Elementary (Oxford) (Traditional and Year Round)
 Wilton Elementary(Franklinton)

Communities

Cities
 Creedmoor
 Oxford (county seat)

Towns
 Butner (largest town)
 Stem
 Stovall

Townships

 Brassfield
 Dutchville
 Fishing Creek
 Oak Hill
 Oxford
 Salem
 Sassafras Fork
 Tally Ho
 Walnut Grove

Unincorporated communities

 Berea
 Brassfield
 Bullock
 Culbreth
 Cozart
 Dexter
 Grassy Creek
 Grissom
 Lewis
 Kinton Fork
 Northside
 Oak Hill
 Providence
 Shake Rag
 Shoofly
 Tally Ho
 Virgilina
 Wilbourns
 Wilton

Notable people
 John Penn- Signer of the Declaration of Independence (Stovall)
 James E. Webb- NASA Administrator (Tally Ho)
 Sam Ragan- Journalist (Berea)
 Richard H. Moore- politician, former NC State Treasurer (Oxford)
 Tiny Broadwick- first female parachutist (Oxford)
 Thad Stem, Jr.- poet (Oxford)
 Franklin Wills Hancock, Jr.- U.S. Representative (Oxford)
 Benjamin Chavis- Civil Rights leader (Oxford)

See also
 List of counties in North Carolina
 National Register of Historic Places listings in Granville County, North Carolina

References

External links

 
 
 Granville County Chamber of Commerce
 The Granville Arts Council
 Granville County Historical Society/Museums
 Northern Granville, Historic Oak Hill, Multi-Cultural Museum and Library

 
1746 establishments in North Carolina
Populated places established in 1746